Two ships of the United States Navy have been named USS McKean, in honor of William McKean.

, was a  during World War II.

United States Navy ship names